Massaka may refer to:

 Massaka people, an ethnic group of Brazil
 Massaka language, a language of Brazil
 Massaka (rapper), Turkish rapper

See also 
 
 Masaka (disambiguation)
 Massacre (disambiguation)

Language and nationality disambiguation pages